Agapema anona, commonly known as the greasewood silkmoth or Mexican agapema, is a species of giant silkmoth in the family Saturniidae.

The MONA or Hodges number for Agapema anona is 7754.1.

Habitat 
Agapema anona inhabits southern Arizona, Texas, and New Mexico, spreading into northern Mexico. Habitat has been described as being plains, plateaus, desert foothills, arroyos, and alluvial fans.

Host plants 
The larvae of Agapema anona feed on plants in the Condalia genus, mainly the knife-leaf condalia, green snakewood, and javelina bush. The adults, as with all Saturniidae species, do not feed.

Subspecies
Three subspecies belong to the species Agapema anona:
 Agapema anona anona (Ottolengui, 1903) 7754.1
 Agapema anona dyari (Cockerell, 1914) 7754.2
 Agapema anona platensis (Peigler & Kendall, 1993) 7754.3

References

Further reading

 
 
 
 
 
 
 
 
 

Saturniinae
Articles created by Qbugbot
Moths described in 1903